TrowelBlazers is a project aimed at increasing the representation of women in the fields of archaeology, geology and palaeontology. The project is run by Brenna Hassett, Victoria Herridge, Suzanne Pilaar Birch and Rebecca Wragg Sykes.

Blog 
TrowelBlazers began as a blog dedicated to women archaeologists, palaeontologists and geologists. As of 2019 the website hosted over 200 biographies. The project originated in a conversation on Twitter, and is noted for utilising a range of digital technologies, including crowdfunding, blogging, digital and print media.

Fossil Hunter Lottie 
The TrowelBlazers team co-designed Fossil Hunter Lottie, a palaeontologist doll.

Raising Horizons exhibition 
An exhibition of photographs, entitled Raising Horizons, taken by Leonora Saunders showcased the diversity of archaeology and geoscience. The exhibition contained portraits of 14 contemporary female scientists, dressed as their historical counterpart. The exhibition displayed at the Geological Society in 2017 and 2019, the British Science Festival, the University Women's Club, London, the Alexander Keiller Museum and the Women Firsts Reception, UK Parliament.

TrowelBlazers 
Trowel-blazing women featured on the website include:

A-C

 Leslie Aiello
 Bridget Allchin
 Lucy Allen
 Harriett M. Allyn
 Ella Al-Shamahi
 Elizabeth Anderson Gray
 Mary Anning

 Zonia Baber
 Lady Mary Bailey
 M. Louise Baker
 Elizabeth Baldwin Garland
 Florence Bascom
 Dorothea Bate
 Betty Baume Clark
 Elise Baumgartel
 Kay Behrensmeyer
 Gertrude Bell
 Etheldred Benett
 Margaret Benson
 Sally Binford
 Caroline Birley
 Nicole Boivin
 Natalya Borisovna Chernykh
 Harriet Boyd Hawes
 Linda Braidwood
 Adela Breton
 Titia Brongersma
 Peggy Brunache
 Winifred Brunton
 Mary Buckland
 Mary Butler

 Halet Çambel
 Beatrice de Cardi, OBE
 Marie Carmichael Stopes
 Gertrude Caton Thompson
 Constanza Ceruti
 Agatha Christie
 Mary Chubb
 Cornelia Clermont Cameron
 Isabel Clifton Cookson
 Madeleine Colani
 Jane Colwell-Danis
 Margaret Conkey
 Helena of Constantinople
 Agnes Conway Horsfield
 Gudrun Corvinus
 Molly Cotton
 Rosemary Cramp
 Dorothy Crowfoot Hodgkin
 Maud Cunnington
 Ethel Currie
 Maria Antonina Czaplicka

D-G

 Princess Dashkova
 Hester Davis
 Mary Dawson
 Frederica de Laguna
 Camilla Dickson
 Jane Dieulafoy
 Emily Dix
 Jane Donald Longstaff
 Lady Eliza D'Oyly Burroughs
 Henrietta Drake-Brockman
 Angela von den Driesch

 Lindsay Eaves
 Tilly Edinger
 Amelia Edwards
 Dianne Edwards
 Mary Ross Ellingson
 Marina Elliott
 Claire Epstein
 Ufuk Esin

 Shahina Farid
 Elen Feuerriegel
 Ayana Flewellen
 Lady Aileen Fox
 Honor Frost

 Dorothy Garrod
 Marie Garstang
 Ione Gedye
 Marija Gimbutas
 Janet Glassbrook
 Winifred Goldring
 Anjali Goswami
 Alice Gorman
 Maria Graham
 Eileen Guppy
 Alia Gurtov
 Margarete Gütschow
 Virginia Grace

H-L

 Laila Haglund
 Mary Harfield
 Katerina Harvati
 Emilie Haspels
 Barbara Hastings
 Nancy Hatch Dupree
 Jacquetta Hawkes
 Margaret Hems
 Dorothy Hill
 Mary Horner Lyell
 Hildegarde Howard

 Asma Ibrahim
 Salima Ikram

 Alexandra Jones
 Margaret Ursula Jones
 Elsie Jury

 Nadezhda Kalugina
 Semni Karouzou
 Solmaz Kashkay
 Kathleen Kenyon
 Zofia Kielan-Jaworowska
 Mary Kingsley
 Alice Kober
 Baldyrgan Seralievna Kozhamkulova
 Elena Efimovna Kuz’mina

 Annette Laming
 Nina Layard
 Frida Leakey
 Mary Leakey
 Maeve Leakey
 Inge Lehmann
 Dorothy Liddell
 Glenys Lloyd-Morgan
 Nieves López Martínez

M-P

 Christian Maclagan
 Lady Rachel Workman MacRobert
 Isabel McBryde
 Catherine McCann
 Margaret McKelvy Bird
 Johanna Mestorf
 Elaine Morgan
 Hannah Morris
 Charlotte Murchison
 Margaret Murray

 Tina Negus
 Zelia Nutall

 Francisca Oboh-Ikuenobe
 Alicia Odewale
 Mihriban Özbaşaran

 Women of the Palestine Exploration Fund
 Maria Rita Palombo
 Sarah Parcak
 Bertha “Birdie” Parker
 Becca Peixotto
 Hilda Petrie
 Elizabeth Pettigrew
 Anne Phillips
 Elizabeth Philpot
 Annie Pirie Quibell
 Joan du Plat Taylor
 Natalia Viktorovna Polosmak
 Tatiana Proskouriakoff
 Galina Pugachenkova

Q-S

 Isabel Ramírez Castañeda
 Catherine Alice Raisin
 Shereen Ratnagar
 Virgínia Rau
 Emily Rayfield
 Emma Reh
 Maria Reiche
 Katherine Routledge
 Charlotte Roberts
 Karen Rubinson
 Margaret Rule

 Jean Sassoon
 Kathy Schick
 Margarethe Lenore Selenka
 Veronica Seton-Williams
 Beth Shapiro
 Margaret B E Shinnie
 Joanna Sofaer
 Sharada Srinivasan
 Magdalina Stancheva
 Lady Hester Stanhope
 Dame Freya Stark
 Norah Dowell Stearns
 Marie Louise Stig Sørensen
 Ellen Stofan
 Brenda Swinbank

T-Z

 Maisie Taylor
 Marie Tharp
 Marguerite Thomas Williams
 Mabel E. Tomlinson
 Ruth Tringham
 Olga Tufnell

 Annie Ure

 Blaire Van Valkenburgh
 Helen Vaughn Michel
 Mary Vaux Walcott (Burgess Shale Trowelblazers)
 Kamilla Vasil’evna Trever
 Magdolna Vicze
 Patricia Vinnicombe
 Elisabeth Vrba

 Helen Walcott (Burgess Shale Trowelblazers)
 Helena Walcott (Burgess Shale Trowelblazers)
 Frances Wagner
 Carol Ward
 Patty Jo Watson
 Elizabeth Wayland Barber
 Gussie White
 Lisa White
 Joan Wiffen
 Audrey Williams
 Alice Wilson
 Peggy Wilson
 Mary “Polly” Winearls Porter
 Ann Wintle
 Margaret Wood
 Mary Ann Woodhouse Mantell
 Hannah Marie Wormington
 Katharine Woolley

 Aslıhan Yener
 Yusra

 Tatyana Alexandrovna Zhdanko
 Zheng Zhenxiang
 Adrienne Zihlman

References

Further reading 
 Wragg-Sykes, B., Herridge, V., Hassett, B. R., & Pilaar-Birch, S. 2013. A Splendid Regiment of Women: 20th century research networks among women scientists in archaeology, geology and palaeontology. In S. Charman-Anderson (Ed.), A Passion For Science. London: Finding Ada Project.
 Hassett, Brenna, Suzanne Pilaar Birch, Victoria Herridge, and Rebecca Wragg Sykes. 2018. TrowelBlazers: accidentally crowdsourcing an archive of women in archaeology. In Shared Knowledge, Shared Power, pp. 129-141. Springer, Cham.
 Hassett, Brenna R., Victoria L. Herridge, Rebecca M. Wragg Sykes, and Suzanne Pilaar Birch. 2019. Activism from the Archives: Changing Narratives to Engage New Communities."In Transforming Heritage Practice in the 21st Century, pp. 399-413. Springer, Cham.

External links

Archaeological organizations
Organizations established in 2019
2019 establishments in England